Endre Antal Miksa DeToth, better known as Andre de Toth (born Endre Antal Mihály Tóth; May 15, 1913 – October 27, 2002), was a Hungarian-American film director, born and raised in Makó, Austria-Hungary. He directed the 3D film House of Wax, despite being unable to see in 3D himself, having lost an eye at an early age. Upon naturalization as a United States citizen in 1945, he took Endre Antal Miksa de Toth as his legal name.

Early life
Born in 1913 as Sasvári farkasfalvi tóthfalusi Tóth Endre Antal Mihály, de Toth earned a degree in law from the Royal Hungarian Pázmány Péter Science's University in Budapest in the early 1930s. He garnered acclaim for plays written as a college student, acquiring the mentorship of Ferenc Molnár and becoming part of the theater scene in Budapest.

Career
De Toth segued from there to the film industry and worked as a writer, assistant director, editor and sometime actor. In 1939 he directed five films just before World War II began in Europe. Several of these films received significant release in the Hungarian communities in the United States. He went to England, spent several years as an assistant to fellow Hungarian émigré Alexander Korda, and eventually moved to Los Angeles in 1942.

Based on his Hungarian films, the production work for Korda and writing he had done on American projects during earlier stints in Los Angeles, he received an oral contract as a director at Columbia Pictures from which he ultimately extricated himself by litigation. He preferred working as an independent and had no "A" budgets early in his career. Thus, he had to supplement his directing income with writing assignments, often uncredited. Introduced to Westerns by John Ford, he worked mostly in that genre throughout the 1950s, often bringing elements of noir style into those films.

In 1951, he received an Oscar nomination for Best Writing (with co-writer William Bowers) for the story filmed as The Gunfighter.

While largely remembered as the director of the earliest and most successful 3D film, House of Wax, de Toth also directed the noir films Pitfall (1948) and Crime Wave (1954).

Personal life

De Toth lost sight in one eye and wore a black eyepatch; as a 1994 report in The Independent noted, this led to an almost deadly incident:

During his seven marriages, de Toth became father and stepfather of 19 children, including editor Nicolas de Toth. He was married to Veronica Lake from 1944 until their divorce in 1952. They had a son, Andre Anthony Michael de Toth III (born October 25, 1945) and a daughter, Diana DeToth (born 1948). In 1953 he married the actress Mary Lou Holloway (née Stratton). At the time of his death in 2002, de Toth was married to his seventh wife, Ann Green.

Memoir
In 1996, he published his memoir, Fragments – Portraits from the Inside (London: Faber and Faber, 1994).

Death
On October 27, 2002, de Toth died from an aneurysm, aged 89. He was interred in Forest Lawn Memorial Park cemetery in the Hollywood Hills.

Partial filmography

 Two Girls on the Street (1939)
 Jungle Book (1942) (second unit director only)
 Passport to Suez (1943)
 None Shall Escape (1944)
 Dark Waters (1944)
 Ramrod (1947)
 The Other Love (1947)
 Pitfall (1948)
 Slattery's Hurricane (1949)
 Man in the Saddle (1951)
 Carson City (1952)
 Springfield Rifle (1952)
 Last of the Comanches (1953)
 House of Wax (1953)
 The Stranger Wore a Gun (1953)
 Thunder Over the Plains (1953)
 Crime Wave (1954)
 Tanganyika (1954)
 Riding Shotgun (1954)
 The Bounty Hunter (1954)
 The Indian Fighter (1955)
 Hidden Fear (1957)
 Monkey on My Back (1957)
 The Two-Headed Spy (1958)
 Day of the Outlaw (1959)
 Man on a String (1960)
 Morgan, the Pirate (Italian title: Morgan il pirata) (1960) 
 The Mongols (Italian title: I mongoli) (1961)
 Lawrence of Arabia (1962) (second unit director only - uncredited)
 Gold for the Caesars (Italian title: Oro per i Cesari) (1963) 
 Play Dirty (1968)
 Superman (1978) (second unit director only - uncredited)

Notes

References

Further reading

External links

 
 
 

1913 births
2002 deaths
American film directors
Hungarian film directors
Western (genre) film directors
20th-century American memoirists
Burials at Forest Lawn Memorial Park (Hollywood Hills)
Deaths from aneurysm
English-language film directors
Hungarian emigrants to the United States
Hungarian nobility
Horror film directors
American people with disabilities